Scattered, Smothered & Covered is Unsane's third studio album, released in 1995 through Amphetamine Reptile. The album is the first to feature bassist Dave Curran, who replaced founding member Pete Shore after he left the band in 1994. Two of the album's tracks, "Scrape" and "Alleged", had music videos produced for them. The music video for "Scrape", a compilation of skate board accident videos, was made for only $169 and was played heavily on MTV. The album was named in honor of Waffle House, a southern restaurant chain. One of Waffle House's advertising campaigns used the phrase "scattered, smothered and covered," a reference to hash browns ordered prepared with onions and cheese.

Reception

Patrick Kennedy from Allmusic said that the album "stripped down and sharpened the band's signature minor-key noise attack", adding that "engineer Tim Mac's facility in gaining instrument separation [...] provided the adrenaline injection Unsane had needed in the studio for years." In 2012, Decibel magazine included the album in its "Hall of Fame" list.

Track listing

Credits
Dave Curran - bass guitar, backing vocals
Vincent Signorelli – drums
Chris Spencer – lead vocals, guitar
Harvey Bennett Stafford – photography

Release history

References

External links
 

Unsane albums
1995 albums
Amphetamine Reptile Records albums